Villukuri (language Tamil, English and Malayalam) is a small village in Kanyakumari district, Tamil Nadu, India.

Demographics
As identified in the 2011 Indian census, Villukuri was divided into 15 wards. The Villukuri Panchayat has a population of 15,304, in which 7,534 were males and 7,770 were females.

The population of children between the ages of 0-6 was 1,525, 9.96% of the total population. The female sex ratio was 1,031 while the state average was about 996. Moreover, the child sex ratio was 890 compared to the Tamil Nadu state average of 943. The literacy rate was 90.52% which was higher than the state average of 80.09%. In Villukuri, male literacy was around 92.73% while female literacy rate about 88.41%.

Postal code 629180

History

Villukuri was once used as an Army Training Camp in the Travancore Kingdom. "Villu" meaning "arrow" while "Kuri" meaning "aiming it". Villukuri was the place where Marthandavarma stored weapons for the Battle of Colachel.

Villukuri Fort was used for training soldiers. After a defeat by the Dutch, captain Dilenoy trained the Travancore army in this fort with specific training on the use of cannons, guns, etc. The fort fell into in ruins due to lack of protective measures by the government.

Education 
Vilikuri hosts many schools:
 Adline Matric Higher Secondary School, Madathattuvilai & kulumaikadu.
 St. Lawrence Higher Secondary School, Madathattuvilai
 St. Alocious Primary School, Madathattuvilai 
 Government Higher Secondary School, Villukuri
 GPS,L.M.Gps.Area School, Villukuri
 GPS School - Villukuri
 New National Nursery & Primary School, Villukuri
 Theresa Nursery & Primary School, Villukuri
 St.Sebastian Matriculation School, Madathattuvilai
 St.Sebastian Computer Education, Madathattuvilai
 Mother Gnanamma Catholic College of Education, Madathattuvilai 
 Viakula Annai Primary School, Konnakuzhivilai
 Desiya Vidya Kindergarten, Nursery & Primary School, Villukuri

Facilities 
Other facilities include:
 Ezhil Theatre  (estd in 1982, now Ezhil Thirumana Mandapam (Heritage Centre))
 Mampalaithuriaru Reservoir 
 SBT Bank Villukuri branch (with ATM)
 Ezhil Thirumana Mandapam( First established marriage hall in villukuri, serves the surrounding people)
 TATA Indicash ATM (With two ATMs)
 KDCC Co-operative society also serves the people around
 Post office
 Saint Sebastian Benefit Fund Limited
 Market (Very big Fish market runs by St. Sebastian church parish, Madathattuvilai and St. Alosious church parish, Villukury which serves the surrounding villagers)

References

https://ezhil-thirumana-mandapam.business.site/

Cities and towns in Kanyakumari district